Stanka Georgieva (born 24 November 1950) is a Bulgarian rowing coxswain. She competed at the 1976 Summer Olympics and the 1980 Summer Olympics.

References

1950 births
Living people
Bulgarian female rowers
Olympic rowers of Bulgaria
Rowers at the 1976 Summer Olympics
Rowers at the 1980 Summer Olympics
Place of birth missing (living people)
Coxswains (rowing)
World Rowing Championships medalists for Bulgaria